Goodman is a masculine given name borne by the following people:

 Goodman Ace (1899–1982), American humorist
 Goodman Dlamini (born 1985), South African soccer player
 Goodman Lipkind (1878–1973), British rabbi
 Goodman Mazibuko (born 1975), South African former soccer player
 Goodman Mosele (born 1999), South African soccer player

Masculine given names